The Chanistsqali  also spelled as  Chanistskali is a river in the historic Mengrelia province of Samegrelo-Zemo Svaneti in western Georgia. It flows through the town Tsalenjikha, and passes through the municipalities Tsalenjikha, Chkhorotsqu, Zugdidi and Khobi. It discharges into the river Khobi near the village Narazeni, north of the town Khobi.

References 

Rivers of Georgia (country)
Tributaries of the Khobi